Chad Marshall is an American producer and director.

Biography 

Marshall started his entertainment career with NBC Entertainment in the summer of 1994 within its finance department, maintaining production budgets for NBC Studios. Later, he became the assistant to the senior vice president who helped create Seinfeld and headed the Late Night and Specials Department for NBC Entertainment.

After leaving NBC in late 1999, Marshall went on to develop original programming at HBO Independent Productions from 1999 to 2000. In the fall of 2001, Marshall helped start KBK Entertainment with Kip Konwiser, where he worked until 2003.

In 2000, Marshall left HBO Independent Productions and started Below The Radar Entertainment. Within its first year, the company had created, sold and produced Suspicion, starring Dean Haglund of The X-Files.

Filmography

Current Projects 

Marshall is in the beginning stages of producing the 10-year anniversary tribute to his 2001 documentary The Underground Poets Railroad.

In November 2013, Marshall signed a studio production deal with Thunder Studios to begin production of season two of Fine Tuned.

Marshall is also currently attached to Where's My Wedding as the creator, producer and director, a television show being co-produced with Trium Entertainment, and Lady V as the creator, producer and director, a television show starring Lady Victoria Hervey.

References

1971 births
American film producers
Living people